Juan A. del Regato (1 March 190912 June 1999) was an oncologist.

Awards
1993 AMA Scientific Achievement Award

References

1909 births
1999 deaths
American oncologists
20th-century American physicians